Viktor Igorevich Fayzulin (born 22 April 1986) is a former Russian footballer, who played as a midfielder.

Career

Club
A graduate of CYSS based in his hometown Nakhodka, he started his professional career with Okean Nakhodka. Later, he played for SKA-Energiya and Spartak Nalchik. In December 2007, he signed a contract with Zenit until December 2010. In February 2012 he extended his contract till 2016.
In April 2018, it was reported that Fayzulin was nearing a comeback after being sidelined with a knee injury since September 2015.  After his contract with FC Zenit Saint Petersburg expired at the end of the 2017–18 season, he announced his retirement after missing 2.5 years due to injury.

International
He made his national team debut on 15 August 2012 in a friendly against Ivory Coast. He scored his first goal for the national team in his next game, a 2014 FIFA World Cup qualifier against Northern Ireland on 7 September 2012. He scored once again in his next game, another World Cup qualifier against Israel on 11 September 2012.

Career statistics

Club

International goals
Scores and goals list Russia's goal tally first.

Career honours
Zenit St. Petersburg
UEFA Cup: 2008
Russian Premier League: 2010, 2011–12, 2014–15
Russian Cup: 2010

References

External links
 Profile at the official FC Zenit St. Petersburg website
 

1986 births
People from Nakhodka
Living people
Russian footballers
Russia under-21 international footballers
Russia national football B team footballers
Russia international footballers
FC Zenit Saint Petersburg players
UEFA Cup winning players
FC Okean Nakhodka players
PFC Spartak Nalchik players
Russian Premier League players
FC SKA-Khabarovsk players
2014 FIFA World Cup players
Association football midfielders
Sportspeople from Primorsky Krai